Shamhat (also called Shamkat in the old Babylonian version of Gilgamesh") is a female character who appears in Tablets I and II of the Epic of Gilgamesh and is mentioned in Tablet VII. She is a sacred prostitute who plays a significant role in bringing the wild man Enkidu into contact with civilization.

In the epic 
Shamhat plays the integral role in Tablet I, of taming the wild man Enkidu, who was created by the gods as the rival to the mighty Gilgamesh. Shamhat was a sacred temple prostitute or harimtu.  She was asked to use her attractiveness to tempt Enkidu from the wild, and his 'wildness', civilizing him through continued sacred love-making. She was brought to a water source where Enkidu had been spotted and exposed herself to Enkidu. He enjoyed Shamhat for "six days and seven nights" (a fragment found in 2015 and read in 2018, disclosed that they had two weeks of sexual intercourse, with a break spent in discussion about Enkidu's future life in Uruk).

Unfortunately for Enkidu, after this long sexual workshop in civility,  his former companions, the wild animals, turned away from him in fright, at the watering hole where they congregated. Shamhat persuades him to follow her and join the civilized world in the city of Uruk, where Gilgamesh is king, rejecting his former life in the wild with the wild animals of the hills. Henceforth, Gilgamesh and Enkidu become the best of friends and undergo many adventures (starting with the Cedar Forest and the encounter with Humbaba).

When Enkidu is dying, he expresses his anger at Shamhat for making him civilized, blaming her for bringing him to the new world of experiences that has led to his death. He curses her to become an outcast. The god Shamash reminds Enkidu that Shamhat fed and clothed him before introducing him to Gilgamesh. Enkidu relents and blesses her, saying that all men will desire her and offer her gifts of jewels.

Significance 
Shamhat's name means literally "the luscious one".

Shamhat's role in bringing Enkidu from nature to civilization through sex has been widely discussed. Rivkah Harris argues that "the intermediate role of the prostitute in transforming Enkidu from one at home with nature and wild animals into a human being is crucial".

According to classicist Paul Friedrich, Shamhat's sexual skills establish "the connection between artful, or sophisticated sensuousness and civilization". Her sexual arts lead Enkidu to understand how basic animal urges can be transformed into something sophisticated, or "civilized". Mesopotamians believed that prostitution was one of the basic features of civilization: "a prime representative of urban life". Shamhat then becomes Enkidu's urbane "mother", teaching him the basics of civilized life, eating, drinking wine, and dressing himself.

Notes 

Epic of Gilgamesh
Courtesans of antiquity
Female prostitutes
Ancient priestesses